Michael Ausserbauer (Außerbauer) aka Blue Mike is a musician: saxophonist, composer, arranger and writer. He was born on 8 March 1961 in Munich, Germany.

Biography
Ausserbauer started playing the soprano saxophone at the age of 16 years. Soon he discovered the tenor saxophone as a new passion. After learning how to play the saxophone by himself, he learned to play under the tutelage of Josef Fischhaber at the KMS Erding.

His first Band was MESA, then he joined the Manfred Anneser-Quartett. 1978 he formed "Das Trio" with Jack Lear and Ernst Seibt. "Das Trio" also performed with Edgar Hoffmann. 1980 Michael Ausserbauer joined Music Liberation Unit (with Franz Dannebauer) and toured Germany. 1981 he wrote a biography about John Coltrane together with Gerd Filtgen.

1981–1996 he was the main saxophonist of the Al Jones Blues Band. The Al Jones Blues Band toured Europe several times and played with famous musicians, such as B.B. King, Champion Jack Dupree, Johnny Winter. The Band is one of the most famous Blues Bands outside the US.

Ausserbauer also played with other musicians such as Eddie C. Campbell, Sal Nistico, Axel Zwingenberger, Vince Weber, Ralf Schicha, Pete Roycroft, Michael Fitz, Luther Allison, Charly Antolini, Gerry Hayes, Peter Tuscher, George Green, Edir and Pery dos Santos, Eddie Taylor, Edgar Hoffmann, Rick Keller, Paul van Lier, William Powell, Albert C. Humphrey and Oskar Klein.

He wrote and played soundtracks for BR (Bayerischer Rundfunk) movies and arranged and composed music for orchestras. 1996 Michael Ausserbauer recorded the CD "Grenzenüberschreiten" with painter Werner Classen, creating one piece of art combining paintings with music.

Georg Karger, Yogo Pausch, Michael Alf and Christian Ludwig Auwald have been joining Ausserbauer in the MAQ (Michael Ausserbauer Quartett) since 2005.

Blue Mike is a well known saxophonist and composer in Germany and appeared on several German newspapers and in TV. Ausserbauer also successfully uses YouTube. He still lives in Germany and started a new Band called "Tenor Steps".

Musical style
Michael Ausserbauer had many influences in his musical career. He started as an autodidact and learned quickly, hearing and playing songs by John Coltrane, Charlie Parker, Sonny Rollins and other musicians. His technique was remarkably good at this early phase. His sound was raw and full-bodied, showing influences of saxophonists like Stanley Turrentine. Ausserbauer soon began to compose music and proved to have a sense for composition.

After leaving Al Jones Blues Band in 1996 he developed a new musical style. In his second phase, Michael Ausserbauer improved his technique and became a more virtuostic player. His sound changed in a unique way; it became higher, more clear and brutal. It would be easy to understand his passion for the saxophone. At this time he played many covers on YouTube.

Ausserbauer's third phase is a young phase, in which he shows other influences in technique and sound. There are no more difficulties in mastering the saxophone. The interesting change is the sound: it is more like the early phase with more passion. It became darker and high notes are more voluminous. Without losing his unique sound, the way Ausserbauer plays shows influences by Michael Brecker, James Carter and John Klemmer.

Discography
 1979 Music Liberation Unit: Love Go
 1981 Al Jones: Movin' 'n' Groovin'
 1987 Ludwig Seuß: Marilyn Sessions
 1989 Al Jones: Hot´n´Heavy
 1992 Michael Fitz: Gefühlsecht
 1994 Ludwig Seuss: Second´s Out
 1995 Al Jones: Watch this!
 1996 Grenzenüberschreiten
 1998 Landluft: A so g'heats gmacht
 2009 MAQ: Dedications
 2012 Romantik Pur
 2012 Wellness Pur
 2012 Klassik Pur
 2015 Tenor Steps: Get It
 2017 Jazz on Vinyl
 2019 Duets - Jazz on Vinyl
 2020 Kisses
 2021 Richie Necker: New songs and untold stories
 2021 Siegmar Zerrath: Five to Four
 2021 Rattlesnake Torpedos: Corona Edition
 2022 All those Cats

References

External links
 SouthernBluesRock: Al Jones Blues Band 2003 Hot 'n' Heavy
 Reeds-Shop - Index
 Ausserbauer-Michael - Iberlibro
 Home - Die offizielle Site von Al Jones and Band

German blues musicians
German jazz saxophonists
Male saxophonists
Bebop musicians
German jazz composers
Male jazz composers
1961 births
Living people
21st-century saxophonists
21st-century German male musicians